Numair Atif Choudhury was a Bangladeshi author, academic and research scholar. His first and only novel, Babu Bangladesh! (Harper Fourth Estate, 2019) has been shortlisted for the Shakti Bhatt First Book Prize for 2019, the first time any Indian literary award shortlisted a posthumously published original work. He is the first author of Bangladeshi origin to be shortlisted for this award. Choudhury died in Kyoto, Japan, in an accident shortly after submitting the final draft of this novel.

Background 
Numair Atif Choudhury was born in Bangladesh on 4 November 1974. After finishing high school in Dhaka, he enrolled in Oberlin College's Creative Writing Program, from which he graduated in 1997. Shortly thereafter, he enrolled in University of East Anglia, Norwich, from where he did his Master's in Creative Writing and Development Studies between 1999 and 2001. He moved to the University of Texas at Dallas, where he worked as a Graduate Assistant before enrolling for the doctoral program. He was awarded his PhD in 2014 for his dissertation on "Unbinding Anthropological Magical Realism".

Choudhury wrote various short stories and essays in addition to his novel during his lifetime. Some of his works have been included in anthologies with Salman Rushdie, Jhumpa Lahiri, Michael Ondaatje and Anita Desai. He started working on Babu Bangladesh! in 2003–04, but it was not until 2018 that he completed his novel.

Babu Bangladesh!
Choudhury's novel, released posthumously, has been hailed as one of the best works in English by a Bangladeshi author. Scroll said "what Babu Bangladesh! truly achieves is laying bare the polyphonic voices that make Bangladesh – voices so numerous and diverse, like Babu's own identity, that it is almost impossible to pin them down", while Mint columnist Sandipan Deb called it "Midnight's Children for that tumultuous nation". Huffington Post said Babu Bangladesh! had "traces of Umberto Eco meet the hallowed traditions of South American magical realism".

Death 
On September 9, 2018, while taking a walk along the Kama-Gawa river in Kyoto, Choudhury slipped and drowned in the river.

References 

1974 births
2018 deaths
20th-century Bangladeshi writers
Oberlin College alumni
Alumni of the University of East Anglia
University of Texas alumni